Chris McCusker (born 13 August 1958 in North Lidcombe, Sydney) is an Australian songwriter, musician and sound designer who has worked with many bands over the last 35 years. He has produced albums for many artists and worked for many years in a recording studio in Bathurst, New South Wales called the Cave.

Early years 
Chris McCusker started performing live with bands as a bass player from 1973. His first band performing some of his, and his older brothers [John McCusker (1956–2006)] songs, from 1974 was a band called Cade.
He played in the band The upSwing, from 1986 to 1992 releasing a self titled album "The upSwing"  and an EP called Third eye.

Current projects
Chris McCusker is currently working with Higgs Boson and the Strange Charm on their new album "World in denial".
He is currently working as a mastering engineer at arthouseMastering and plays bass with Shaking Hands, Copperwing Trio, Emotional Park Vandals  and is the last surviving member of the Abercrombie House Jazz Men.

Discography 
Young Blood II (1990 – compilation album – RooArt upSwing
The upSwing (1991) upSwing 
Third Eye (1993) upSwing  
Cockys Joy Live (1997) Cockies Joy
Glory Box (1998) Glory Box
Quantum Connections (2016) Higgs Boson and the Strange Charm 
World in denial (2022) Higgs Boson and the Strange Charm

Albums mastered 
Requested (1988) Peter Coad.
It's Alright (2010) Spike Flynn.
When Small Talk Leads To Arguments (2011) Will Tremain.
Higgs Boson and the Strange Charm (2011) Higgs Boson and the Strange Charm
Quantum Connections (2016) Higgs Boson and the Strange Charm
World in denial (2022) Higgs Boson and the Strange Charm

Filmography 
The Complex 2020 (Short) (sound design)
Angelfish 2016 (Short) (sound design) 
Swingers  2015 (Short) (sound design) 
Last Bites  2014 (Short) (sound design) 
The Hand That Feeds  2013 (Short) (sound design) 
Reception  2011 (Short) (sound design) 
Bored Games 2010 (Short) (sound design)

References

1959 births
Living people
Australian musicians